Shaikh Rajada, also spelled Shaikherjada, is a village on Pasroor Road in Gujranwala District in West Punjab (Pakistan), with a population of around 5000 as of 2021. It is said that the village is named after a person Shaikhu. He has three other brothers named Pandu, Gagard and Azam so the sarounded villages are named after them i.e. Gagarke, Pandupur, Thata Azam Khan respectively.

90% of population is muslim and around 10% are christens. Punjabi is mother tongue of the villagers. Basically village belongs to Buttar of Jutt clan but Cheema, Chatha, Virk , Minhas etc are also living.

Education

The village has Govt. Primary Schools for boys and girls. However, since it is near to the city hence over 30% of children are getting their education from the main city's school. The literacy rate of the village is nearly 60%.

Economy

The main source of income of families here is agriculture. Nearly 70% of population is, directly or indirectly, affiliated with agriculture. Main crops of the village are Rice/Wheat and strawberry. Being near to the main city Shaikh Rajada is growing very fast in terms of population. Moreover, the village is exposed to brick Kiln.

References

Villages in Gujranwala District